Richard L. Jacob Ph.D. (born September 24, 1958, in Niagara Falls, New York), is a sports coach and educator. He was head coach of Buffalo's Professional Basketball Team Buffalo Rapids from 2005 through 2006. He left the position in November 2006 to become the interim Chairman of the Business Department Medaille College. He currently is an associate professor of Sport and Business at Medaille and is the head of the college's Sport Management program. He was named the General Manager and Head Coach of the new Buffalo Sharks team in 2008, before that team closed and moved to the Premier Basketball League. Jacob was then named the head coach for the Buffalo Stampede, but soon resigned for personal reasons. He formerly coached at Niagara University, Niagara County Community College, the University at Buffalo, Villa Maria College, Daemen College, Buffalo State College, and Medaille.

He graduated from Niagara Catholic High School and Eisenhower College and obtained master's degrees in physical education and educational counseling at Canisius College and Niagara University, respectively. He later received his doctorate from SUNY Buffalo in school/educational psychology.

References

External links 
Biography at Medaille.edu
Biography from Medaille Sport Management

1958 births
American Basketball Association (2000–present) coaches
Basketball coaches from New York (state)
Eisenhower College alumni
Canisius College alumni
Living people
Sportspeople from Niagara Falls, New York
University at Buffalo alumni